Guillaume Edelin , was a confessed male witch, convicted in 1453, and the first person to confess to have flown on a broom.

Life

Edelin was the Prior of Saint-Germain-en-Laye, an Augustinian and a Doctor of Divinity. He promulgated the idea that it was impossible for the Devil to make pacts or witches to fly on brooms. After being arrested, he confessed that he had signed a compact with the Devil to satisfy his carnal desires, part of this being that he pretend that witchcraft was impossible. The compact was afterwards found upon his person. He also confessed that he had "done homage to the Enemy, under the form of a sheep, by kissing his posteriors,"  and to having gone to the Sabbath "mounted on a balai", the first reference to the use of a broomstick in connection with witchcraft.

After his capture, he repented and was imprisoned for the rest of his life in the city of Évreux.

References 

Man, Myth and Magic: An Illustrated Encyclopedia of the Supernatural. 1970, edited by Richard Cavendish.

15th-century French people
People convicted of witchcraft
Augustinian friars
Priors
1453 in Europe
1450s in France
Witch trials in France